Akaal Channel is a UK based, free-to-air satellite television channel which is dedicatedly focused on Sikhism and the Sikh community. Founded by Amrik Singh Kooner, the channel also broadcasts across 44 countries, including Europe, on satellite television. Formerly known as Sikh TV, the channel has a center in Amritsar as well.

Awards and recognition 
 Sikhs in Media at 7th Annual Sikhs Award, London
 The channel was reported to rank at number 21 in the category of UK Asian Entertainment TV channels at the end of April 2019.
Best World Sikh Media, Annual Sikh Awards 2017

Programming 
The channel features a one-hour current affairs program weekly called 'Big Question.

Humanitarian aid 
The channel also has an 'Akaal Channel Aid' which is a humanitarian agency.

See also 
 Sikhism in England
 Sikhism in the United Kingdom

References 

Broadcasting in Birmingham, West Midlands
Religious television channels in the United Kingdom
Sikh mass media
Sikhism in the United Kingdom